Yury Yakovlevich Tsapenko (born 25 July 1938) is a retired Soviet artistic gymnast. He competed at the 1964 Summer Olympics in all artistic gymnastics events and won a silver medal in the team allround competition and a bronze medal on the pommel horse.

During his career he won five national titles: on the floor (1961), parallel bars (1961) and pommel horse (1961, 1963, 1964). After retirement he worked as a coach, first in Moscow and then in his native Almaty. 

His wife Natalya Tsapenko is also a former competitive gymnast and coach.

References

1938 births
Living people
Sportspeople from Almaty
Gymnasts at the 1964 Summer Olympics
Olympic gymnasts of the Soviet Union
Olympic silver medalists for the Soviet Union
Olympic medalists in gymnastics
Kazakhstani male artistic gymnasts
Soviet male artistic gymnasts
Medalists at the 1964 Summer Olympics
Olympic bronze medalists for the Soviet Union